"Take Me" is a song by Dutch disc jockey and producer Tiësto with vocals from singer Kyler England. It was released on 14 May 2013 in the Netherlands. It is the second single from the Tiësto mixed compilation Club Life, Vol. 3 - Stockholm. The song is included in the deluxe version of the album A Town Called Paradise.

Background and release 
Tiësto declared about the song : "It's a combination of the old and the new Tiësto. It's housy but has this trancy vocal in it, and the melody is great. It's definitely the perfect definition of what I stand for at the moment — from the past until now."

Music video 
The music video was directed by Jeff Wash. It features the actresses Tamara Rey and Joyce Pickens. It is a lyric video showing a desert joyride in a car with the two girls.

Track listing 
Digital Download (MF049)
 "Take Me" - 6:01

Digital Download / CD single
 Europe (PM:AM)
 "Take Me" (Radio Edit)  - 3:32
 "Take Me" (Extended Mix) - 6:01

 US (Casablanca/Republic)
 "Take Me" (Extended Mix) - 6:01
 "Take Me" (Radio Edit)  - 3:32

Digital Download
 "Take Me" (Michael Brun Remix) - 5:53

Digital Download
 "Take Me" (Nifra Remix) - 6:31

2017 7" Translucent Blue Vinyl
 "Take Me" (Extended Mix) - 6:01
 "Take Me" (Radio Edit) - 3:32

Charts

Weekly charts

Year-end charts

References 

2013 songs
2013 singles
Tiësto songs
Songs written by Tiësto